Justice Christianson may refer to:

Adolph M. Christianson, associate justice of the North Dakota Supreme Court
Theodore Christianson (judge), associate justice of the Minnesota Supreme Court
William C. Christianson, associate justice of the Minnesota Supreme Court